The Head of Christ is a Jesus head conserved at the National Art Museum of Catalonia.

Description
Jaume Cascalls is one of the most important sculptors of the fourteenth century in Catalonia. This is borne out by his involvement over almost thirty years with the project of the royal pantheon in Poblet for King Peter the Ceremonious and with other large undertakings of the time. Today, on stylistic grounds, he is credited with this 'Head of Christ', which must have formed part of a sculptural group of the Holy Sepulchre, presumably from the church of the convent of Sant Agustí Vell in Barcelona. The break in the neck suggests it belonged to a full-length recumbent Christ, like the one kept at Sant Feliu in Girona and also attributed to Cascalls.

References

External links
 The artwork at Museum's website

14th-century sculptures
Sculptures in Catalonia
Sculptures of the Museu Nacional d'Art de Catalunya
Jesus in art
Sculptures of men in Spain